Crews is an English surname.

People 
 Albert H. Crews, a retired colonel in the United States Air Force and a former USAF astronaut
 Andrew Crews, a professional Australian football (soccer) goalkeeper
 Art Crews, a retired American wrestler
 Bill Crews (politician), a former mayor of Melbourne, Iowa, United States
 Bill Crews (Australian clergyman), a minister in the Australian Uniting Church
 C.C. Crews, an American Civil War colonel
 Charlie Crews, a fictional detective whose story is depicted in the American television drama Life
 David Crews, an American educator
 David William Crews, an American lawyer and politician
 Donald Crews, an American writer and illustrator of several well-known children's picture books
 Frederick C. Crews, an essayist, author and Professor of English Emeritus at the University of California, Berkeley, United States
 Harry Crews, an American novelist, short story writer and essayist
 Jeanne Lee Crews, an American engineer at NASA
 Jim Crews, the men's basketball coach at the United States Military Academy
 John R. Crews, a soldier in the United States Army who received the Medal of Honor for his actions in World War II
 Joseph Crews, American politician
 Kambri Crews, an American comedic storyteller and writer, great-niece of John R. Crews
 Laura Hope Crews, a character actress
 Terry Crews, an actor and former American football player who played in the National Football League
 Tim Crews, an American Major League Baseball pitcher
 Tonya Crews, an American model

External links 
 The Crews surname DNA project